David Nelken is a Distinguished Professor of Legal Institutions and Social Change (Professore  Ordinario, di chiara fama) Faculty of Political Science, University of Macerata and the Distinguished Visiting Research Professor, Faculty of Law, Cardiff University. His work focuses primarily on comparative criminal justice and comparative sociology of law.

Selected publications

Monographs
Comparative Criminal Justice: Making Sense of Difference, Sage, 2010
Beyond Law in Context: Developing a Sociological Understanding of Law, Ashgate, 2009, 
The Limits of the Legal Process. A Study of Landlords, Law and Crime, Academic Press, 1983

Edited volumes
Comparative Criminal Justice and Globalization, edited, Ashgate, 2011
European Ways of Law: Towards a European Sociology of Law, edited with Volkmar Gessner, Hart Publishing, 2007
Explorations in Legal Cultures, edited with Fred Bruinsma, Elsevier, 2007
 Law's New Boundaries: The consequences of Legal Autopoiesis, edited with Jiří Přibáň, Ashgate Publishing, Aldershot, 2001, 
Adapting Legal Cultures, edited with Johannes Feest, Hart Publishing, Oxford, 2001, 
Contrasting Criminal Justice: Getting from Here to There, edited, Ashgate, 2000
Comparing Legal Cultures, edited, Dartmouth 1997, Nelken D, Tsinghua university Press, Peking, China (2003) .
Italian Politics: The Center-Left in Power, edited with Roberto D'Alimonte, Westview, 1997
The Futures of Criminology, edited, Sage, 1994

References

Living people
British political scientists
Academics of Cardiff University
Academic staff of the University of Macerata
Year of birth missing (living people)